Wymysław  is a village in the administrative district of Gmina Chodzież, within Chodzież County, Greater Poland Voivodeship, in west-central Poland.

The village has a population of 89.

References

Villages in Chodzież County